Marius Strangl (born October 2, 1990) is a German footballer who plays for SpVgg Bayreuth.

External links

1990 births
Living people
German footballers
SpVgg Greuther Fürth players
FC Rot-Weiß Erfurt players
3. Liga players
Association football midfielders
Sportspeople from Erlangen
Footballers from Bavaria